Jadunath Singh (1916 –1948) was an Indian Army soldier who was posthumously awarded the Param Vir Chakra, India's highest military decoration for his actions in an engagement during the Indo-Pakistani War of 1947.

Singh was enlisted in the British Indian Army in 1941 and served in the Second World War, fighting against the Japanese in Burma. He later took part in the Indo-Pakistani War of 1947 as a member of the Indian Army. For an action on 6 February 1948 at Tain Dhar, to the north of Naushahra, Naik Singh was awarded the Param Vir Chakra.

Singh commanded a nine-man forward section post. Though heavily outnumbered by advancing Pakistani forces, Singh led his men in defending against three attempts to overtake the post. He was wounded during the second assault.  Armed with a Sten gun, he single-handedly charged the third assault with such determination as to cause the attackers to withdraw. In doing so, he was killed. A sports stadium in Shahjahanpur and a crude oil tanker were named after Singh.

Early life 
Singh was born in a Rathore Rajput family on 21 November 1916 in Khajuri village of Shahjahanpur, Uttar Pradesh. He was the son of Birbal Singh Rathore, a farmer, and Jamuna Kanwar. He was the third of eight children, with six brothers and a sister.

Though Singh studied up to fourth year standard in a local school in his village, he could not continue his education further due to his family's economic situation. He spent most of his childhood helping out his family with agricultural work around the farm. For recreation, he wrestled and eventually became the wrestling champion of his village. For his character and well-being, he was nicknamed "Hanuman Bhagat Bal Brahmachari". This was after Hanuman, a Hindu god who was unmarried for life. Singh never married.

Military career

During the Second World War, Singh enlisted in the 7th Rajput Regiment of the British Indian Army, on 21 November 1941 at Fatehgarh Regimental Centre. On completing his training, Singh was posted to the regiment's 1st Battalion. During late 1942, the battalion was deployed to the Arakan Province during the Burma campaign, where they fought against the Japanese. The battalion was part of the 47th Indian Infantry Brigade, assigned to the 14th Indian Infantry Division. It fought actions around the Mayu Range in late 1942 and early 1943, advancing up the Mayu Peninsula towards Donbaik as part of an operation to recapture Akyab Island. Although the Rajputs were held up around the cluster of villages called Kondan in December 1942, the advance slowly continued towards Donbaik. It was there, where the brigade's attack ground to a halt and they were subsequently relieved by the 55th Indian Infantry Brigade in early February 1943. In early April, the Japanese counterattacked.  The 47th Brigade became cut off around Indan and eventually split off into small groups to fight their way back to Allied lines. The surviving members of the brigade returned to India. In 1945, Singh's battalion was assigned to the 2nd Indian Infantry Brigade and took over the defence of the Andaman and Nicobar Islands. The islands had been partially occupied by the Japanese forces, which surrendered on 7 October 1945. After returning to India, Singh was promoted to the rank of Naik (corporal). After the partition, the 7th Rajput Regiment was assigned to the Indian Army. Singh remained with the newly raised Indian regiment, continuing to serve in its 1st Battalion.

War of 1947

In October 1947, following an offensive by the Pakistani raiders in Jammu and Kashmir, the Defence Committee of the Indian Cabinet directed the Army Headquarters to undertake a military response. The Army planned several operations to drive out the raiders as directed. In one such operation, the 50th Para Brigade, to which the Rajput Regiment was attached, was ordered to secure Naushahra and establish a base at Jhangar in mid-November.

Bad weather prevented this action and on 24 December, Jhangar, a strategically advantageous position in the Naushahra Sector, was captured by the Pakistanis which gave them control over the communication lines between Mirpur and Poonch (town)Poonch and provided a starting point from which attacks could be made on Naushahra. The following month, the Indian Army undertook several operations in the north-west of Naushahra to stop further advances by the Pakistani forces. Brigadier Mohammad Usman, the commanding officer of the 50th Para Brigade, had made necessary arrangements to counter the expected attack. Soldiers were deployed in small groups on possible enemy approaches.

Tain Dhar, lying to the north of Naushahra, was one such approach for which Singh's battalion was responsible. On the morning of 6 February 1948, at 6:40 am IST, Pakistani forces opened fire on pickets from the battalion patrolling along Tain Dhar ridge. Gunfire was exchanged between both sides. The foggy early morning darkness helped the attacking Pakistanis creep up to the pickets. Soon, men in the posts on the Tain Dhar ridge observed a large number of Pakistani soldiers moving towards them. Singh was in command of the nine personnel manning the forward post of the second picket at Tain Dhar. Singh and his section were able to ward off three successive attempts by Pakistani forces to capture their position. By the end of third wave, of the 27 men at the post, 24 were dead or severely wounded. Singh being a section commander at the post, displayed "exemplary" leadership, and kept motivating his men till he succumbed to his wounds. This proved a very critical moment for the battle at Naushahra. In the meantime, Brigadier Usman sent a company of the 3rd (Para) Battalion, Rajput Regiment, to reinforce Tain Dhar. Without Singh engaging the Pakistani troops for a considerable period, re-capture of these posts would have been impossible.

Param Vir Chakra

Singh was posthumously awarded the India's highest military decoration, the Param Vir Chakra for his actions on 6 February 1948. The official citation is as follows:

Legacy
The Shipping Corporation of India (SCI), an Indian Government enterprise under the Ministry of Shipping, named fifteen of her crude oil tankers in honour of the Param Vir Chakra recipients. The crude oil tanker named MT Naik Jadunath Singh, PVC was delivered to SCI on 21 September 1984. The tanker was phased out after 25 years of service. A sports stadium in Shahjahanpur, the town near the village where Singh was born, was named as "Paramveer Chakra Lance Nayak Jadunath Singh Sports Stadium" in his honour.

Notes
Footnotes

Citations

References

External links
PVC recipients on Indian Army website

1948 deaths
Indian Army personnel
Recipients of the Param Vir Chakra
People from Uttar Pradesh
People from Shahjahanpur
1916 births